Genaro Luis Arriagada Herrera (born 26 January 1943) is a Chilean politician who served as minister.

In December 2021, after 58 years of militance, he resigned to the Christian Democracy.

References

1943 births

Living people
20th-century Chilean politicians
21st-century Chilean politicians
University of Chile alumni
Harvard University alumni
Radical Party of Chile politicians
Christian Democratic Party (Chile) politicians
Politicians from Santiago
Chilean political commentators